The Qarabağ 2011–12 season was Qarabağ's 19th Azerbaijan Premier League season, and their fourth season under Gurban Gurbanov. They finished the season in 4th place, and were knocked out of the 2011–12 Azerbaijan Cup at the Semi-final stage by FK Baku. They also participated in the 2011–12 UEFA Europa League, entering at the first qualifying round stage. They beat Banga Gargždai of Lithuania, before beating EB/Streymur of the Faroe Islands on away goals in the second qualifying round. They were knocked out of the Europa League in the third qualifying round against Club Brugge of Belgium, losing 4-2 on aggregate. Their kits was manufactured by Kappa and was sponsored by Azersun.

Squad

Transfers

Summer

In:

Out:

Winter

In:

Out:

Competitions

Azerbaijan Premier League

Results summary

Results by round

Results

League table

Azerbaijan Premier League Championship Group

Results

Table

Azerbaijan Cup

UEFA Europa League

Qualifying phase

Squad statistics

Appearances and goals

|-
|colspan="14"|Players who appeared for Qarabağ no longer at the club:

|}

Goal scorers

Disciplinary record

Monthly awards

Annual awards

Notes
Note 1: Qarabağ played their home match at Tofiq Bahramov Stadium, Baku as their own Guzanli Olympic Complex Stadium did not meet the UEFA criteria.
Note 2: EB/Streymur played their home match at Gundadalur, Tórshavn as their own Við Margáir did not meet the UEFA criteria.

References

External links
 Qarabağ at Soccerway.com

Qarabag
Qarabağ FK seasons
Qarabag